Knob Creek is a stream in Cass and Henry counties of central western Missouri. It is a tributary of South Grand River.

The stream headwaters arise just north of Missouri Route 35 about two miles southeast of Garden City and it flows to the southeast generally parallel to Route 35. The stream enters Henry County just southeast of Creighton and continues to the southeast to its confluence with the South Grand about two miles west of Urich.

References

Rivers of Cass County, Missouri
Rivers of Henry County, Missouri
Rivers of Missouri